Lorca Club de Fútbol was a Spanish football team based in Lorca, in the autonomous community of the Region of Murcia. Founded in 1994, it was dissolved in 2002, and held home games at Estadio Municipal de San José, with an 8,000-seat capacity.

History
Founded in 1994 as a merger of Club de Fútbol Lorca Deportiva, Lorca Promesas CF and UD Lorca, the club started his first season achieving promotion from Tercera División. It subsequently fluctuated between the fourth division and Segunda División B in the following seasons, but folded in 2002.

Season to season

3 seasons in Segunda División B
5 seasons in Tercera División

External links
ArefePedia team profile 
Historia del Fútbol en Lorca team profile 

Football clubs in the Region of Murcia
Association football clubs established in 1994
Association football clubs disestablished in 2002
1994 establishments in Spain
2002 disestablishments in Spain
Lorca, Spain